The tradition of wassailing (alt sp wasselling) falls into two distinct categories: the house-visiting wassail and the orchard-visiting wassail. The house-visiting wassail is the practice of people going door-to-door, singing and offering a drink from the wassail bowl in exchange for gifts; this practice still exists, but has largely been displaced by carolling. The orchard-visiting wassail refers to the ancient custom of visiting orchards in cider-producing regions of England, reciting incantations and singing to the trees to promote a good harvest for the coming year. Notable traditional wassailing songs include "Here We Come a-Wassailing", "Gloucestershire Wassail", and "Gower Wassail".

Etymology

According to the Oxford English Dictionary, the word "wassail" originated as a borrowing from the Old Norse salutation ves heill, corresponding to Old English hál wes þú or wes hál – literally meaning 'be in good health' or 'be fortunate'. It was initially used in the sense of 'hail' or 'farewell'. Later it developed into the first part of a drinking formula "wassail...drinkhail". By  1300, the sense had extended to the drink itself, especially to the spiced ale used in Twelfth-night and Christmas Eve celebrations, and by 1598 it was being applied to the custom of drinking healths on those nights.

Wassailing during Christmastide 
Traditionally, the wassail is celebrated on Twelfth Night (variously on either January 5 or 6). Some people still wassail on "Old Twelvey Night", January 17, as it would have been before the introduction of the Gregorian Calendar in 1752.

In the middle ages, the wassail was a reciprocal exchange between the feudal lords and their peasants as a form of recipient-initiated charitable giving, to be distinguished from begging. This point is made in the song "Here We Come A-wassailing", when the wassailers inform the lord of the house that

The lord of the manor would give food and drink to the peasants in exchange for their blessing and goodwill, i.e.

This would be given in the form of the song being sung. Wassailing is the background practice against which an English carol such as "We Wish You a Merry Christmas" can be made sense of. The carol lies in the English tradition where wealthy people of the community gave Christmas treats to the carollers on Christmas Eve such as 'figgy puddings'.

Although wassailing is often described in innocuous and sometimes nostalgic terms—still practised in some parts of Scotland  and Northern England on New Years Day as "first-footing"—the practice in England has not always been considered so innocent. Similar traditions have also been traced to Greece and the country of Georgia. Wassailing was associated with rowdy bands of young men who would enter the homes of wealthy neighbours and demand free food and drink (in a manner similar to the modern children's Halloween practice of trick-or-treating). If the householder refused, he was usually cursed, and occasionally his house was vandalized. The example of the exchange is seen in their demand for "figgy pudding" and "good cheer", i.e., the wassail beverage, without which the wassailers in the song will not leave; "We won't go until we get some, so bring some out here". Such complaints were also common in the early days of the United States, where the practice (and its negative connotations) had taken root by the early 1800s; it led to efforts from the American merchant class to promote a more sanitized Christmas.

The Orchard-visiting Wassail 

In the cider-producing West of England (primarily the counties of Devon, Somerset, Dorset, Gloucestershire and Herefordshire) wassailing also refers to drinking (and singing) the health of trees in the hopes that they might better thrive. Wassailing is also a traditional event in Jersey, Channel Islands where cider (cidre) made up the bulk of the economy before the 20th century. The format is much the same as that in England but with terms and songs often in Jèrriais.

17th-century English lyric poet Robert Herrick writes in his poem "The Wassail": 

The purpose of wassailing is to awake the cider apple trees and to scare away evil spirits to ensure a good harvest of fruit in autumn. The ceremonies of each wassail vary from village to village but they generally all have the same core elements. A wassail King and Queen lead the song and/or a processional tune played or sung from one orchard to the next. The wassail Queen will then be lifted up into the boughs of the tree where she will place toast soaked in Wassail from the Clayen Cup as a gift to the tree spirits (and to show the fruits created the previous year). Then an incantation is usually recited, such as:

This incantation is followed by noise-making from the assembled crowd until the gunsmen give a final volley through the branches. The crowd then moves onto the next orchard. 

As the largest cider producing region of the country, the West Country hosts historic wassails annually, such as Whimple in Devon and Carhampton in Somerset, both on 17 January, or old Twelfth Night. Many new, commercial or "revival" wassails have also been introduced throughout the West Country, such as those in Stoke Gabriel and Sandford, Devon. Clevedon in North Somerset holds an annual wassailing event at the Clevedon Community Orchard, combining the traditional elements of the festival with the entertainment and music of the Bristol Morris Men.

Nineteenth-century wassailers of Somerset would sing the following lyrics after drinking the cider until they were "merry and gay":

A folktale from Somerset reflecting this custom tells of the Apple Tree Man, the spirit of the oldest apple tree in an orchard, and in whom the fertility of the orchard is thought to reside. In the tale a man offers his last mug of mulled cider to the trees in his orchard and is rewarded by the Apple Tree Man who reveals to him the location of buried gold.

Wassail bowls 

Wassail bowls, generally in the shape of goblets, have been preserved. The Worshipful Company of Grocers made a very elaborate one in the seventeenth century, decorated with silver. It is so large that it must have passed around as a "loving cup" so that many members of the guild could drink from it.

In the English Christmas carol "Gloucestershire Wassail", the singers tell that their "bowl is made of the white maple tree, with a wassailing bowl we'll drink to thee". As white maple does not grow natively in Europe, the lyric may be a reference to sycamore maple or field maple, both of which do, and both of which have white-looking wood. This is reinforced by an 1890s written account from a man describing the wassailing bowl of his friend from Gloucestershire:

Alternatively however, many formal publications from the 1800s list the lyric simply as saying "maplin tree", without mentioning "white". Additionally, the lyric appears to have varied significantly depending on location and other factors, calling into question how literal the term was and/or how varied the construction of wassail bowls was. For example, a 1913 publication by Ralph Vaughan Williams, who had recorded the lyric in 1909 by a wassailer in Herefordshire, recorded it as "green maple". Another version from Brockweir listed the bowl as being made from mulberry.

There are surviving examples of "puzzle wassail bowls", with many spouts. As you attempt to drink from one of the spouts, you are drenched from another spout. The drink was either punch, mulled wine or spicy ale.

See also 

 Apple Day
 First-foot
 Jasličkári
 Koliada
 List of Christmas carols
 Mari Lwyd
 Mummers' play
 Julebukking, Scandinavia 
 Wassail
 Wish tree
 Yule goat
Polaznik

References 
Oxford English Dictionary
Merriam-Webster Online Dictionary "Wassail."
Birmingham Museums & Art Gallery Wassail Bowl
"Reminiscences of Life" in the parish of Street, Somersetshire dated 1909 at pages 25-26 written by an "old inhabitant" William Pursey of Street 1836-1919. This is the art of wassail.

Notes

External links 

Christmas in England
Christmas music
Winter traditions
Cider
English traditions